The Shellharbour City Sharks are a Country Rugby League club founded in 1920 located on the South Coast of NSW that compete in the South Coast Group 7 competition.

Club Info

History
Shellharbour City RLFC has a 113-year history, originally existed as a rugby union club, before switching to rugby league in 1920.

The club have won five first-grade premierships in total, as well as over 30 reserve, third, and under-18 premierships. The club's inaugural first grade premiership was in 1939. The last premiership was won in 2001.

The Shellharbour LGA itself forms the southern part of the Greater Wollongong urban area.

Shellharbour City Marlins
In 2007, Shellharbour City struck a deal with NRL side the St. George Illawarra Dragons and thus created a new team and entered themselves into the NSWRL Jim Beam Cup with the name Shellharbour City Marlins using the colours as their parent club. It is rumoured that the name Marlins was chosen to differentiate themselves from any Cronulla Sharks sides. The Shellharbour Sharks still competed in Group 7 Rugby League competition during this time. During 2008, the Dragons leagues club however did not give the same backing to Sharks, instead the Sharks stayed alive through other sponsorship deals, most notably Corban KIA. 2009 saw a change in direction again with both the Sharks side moving into the Illawarra Carlton League and the Marlins side moving into the NSW Cup. This resulted in the Marlins changing their name to Shellharbour City Dragons and consequently changing their strip to the more famous Red-V.

Shellharbour City Dragons

Ron Costello Oval
Ron Costello Oval (formally Fuller Park) has been the home of Shellharbour City Rugby League Football Club since the mid-1950s.

Notable Juniors
 Ron Costello - Wests, Canterbury, NSW, and Australian Kangaroo. The Shellharbour Sharks home ground, Ron Costello Oval, is named after him.
 Luke Bailey - St George Illawarra, Gold Coasts captain, NSW and Australian front row forward.
 Matt Cooper - St George Illawarra, NSW, and Australian centre
 Dan Hunt - St George Illawarra and Country prop.
 Trent Merrin - St George Illawarra, Country, NSW and Australian Lock.
 Adam Docker - Penrith Panthers
Euan Aitken - St George Illawarra
Jai Field - St George Illawarra

Honours
 Group 7 Rugby League Premierships: 6
 1939, 1962, 1971, 1973, 2001, 2018

 Second Grade Premierships: 14
 1959, 1962, 1963, 1964, 1965, 1971, 1973, 1975, 1983, 1990, 2001,2003, 2004, 2005, 2006
 Third Grade Premierships: 2
 1971, 1977
 Group 7 U-18's Premierships: 11
 1944, 1957, 1959, 1960, 1961, 1963, 1964, 2003, 2007, 2008, 2020
 Illawarra U-18's Premierships: 3
 2009, 2010, 2012

Source:

References

External links
 Shellharbour Sharks Illawarra District Homepage
 Shellharbour Sharks Junior South Coast District Homepage
 Sharks clubpage
 Country Rugby League Homepage
 South Coast Rugby League Homepage
 Illawarra District League

Rugby league teams in Wollongong
St. George Illawarra Dragons
Rugby clubs established in 1920
1920 establishments in Australia
South Coast (New South Wales)